Katina is a Croatian island in the Adriatic Sea located between Dugi Otok to the north and Kornat to the south.

It is a part of the nature park Telašćica.

References 

Islands of the Adriatic Sea
Islands of Croatia
Uninhabited islands of Croatia
Landforms of Zadar County